Thomas Matthijs Adrianus Cordes (born 30 May 1966) is a retired Dutch cyclist. He competed at the 1988 Summer Olympics in the individual road race and 100 km team time trial and finished in 42nd and 11th place, respectively. During his career he won two world titles, in the road race (junior, 1985) and team time trial (senior, 1986). He also won the Hel van het Mergelland (1987), Ronde van Overijssel (1987) and Vuelta a Murcia (1990), as well as individual stages of the Tour de Pologne (1985), Tour of Sweden (1988), Tour of Galicia (1989), Volta a la Comunitat Valenciana (1989), Vuelta a España (1992) and Olympia's Tour (1997, 1998, 1999).

See also
 List of Dutch Olympic cyclists

References

1966 births
Living people
Olympic cyclists of the Netherlands
Cyclists at the 1988 Summer Olympics
Dutch male cyclists
People from De Ronde Venen
UCI Road World Champions (elite men)
UCI Road World Championships cyclists for the Netherlands
Cyclists from Utrecht (province)
20th-century Dutch people
21st-century Dutch people